Ryan Lee Hancock (born November 11, 1971) is a retired professional baseball player who played one season for the California Angels of Major League Baseball. On June 9, 1996, he was one of two American League pitchers to get a hit during the 1996 season. The other AL pitcher to get a hit that year was Roger Clemens on May 23. 
He was drafted by the Angels right out of high school but turned it down so he could play both football and baseball for Brigham Young University. At BYU, he was a 3rd string quarterback who ended up getting his chance to play after the starter and 2nd string were injuries early on in the season. After he suffered a devastating ACL injury in the last game of the regular season, Ryan focused solely on baseball. After his sophomore year, he was drafted by the Anaheim Angels once again. Ryan played in the Minor leagues until his first Major League game on June 8, 1996.
Ryan was offered to play in Japan with the Fukuoka Daiei Hawks, so he took their offer and played in Japan for one season.

References

Major League Baseball pitchers
California Angels players
Baseball players from California
1971 births
Living people
American expatriate baseball players in Japan
Zion Pioneerzz players
Anchorage Bucs players
Boise Hawks players
Erie SeaWolves players
Lake Elsinore Storm players
Las Vegas Stars (baseball) players
Midland Angels players
Vancouver Canadians players
BYU Cougars baseball players
BYU Cougars football players